Anton Franz de Paula Graf Lamberg-Sprinzenstein (1740 – 1822) was an Austrian diplomat and art collector.

Early life 
Anton Frazn was born in Vienna as the eldest son of Count Franz de Paula Anton Flavius von Lamberg-Sprinzenstein (1707-1765) and his second wife, Countess Maria Josefa Eleonora Esterházy von Galántha (1712-1756).

Biography 
During his diplomatic career he spent six years in Naples where he collected over 500 ancient Greek vases that he later donated in 1815 to the Cabinet of Antiquities in Vienna (now part of the Kunsthistorisches Museum there). In 1807 he became an honorary member of the Academy of Fine Arts in Vienna and in 1818, after retiring from the diplomatic service, he bequeathed to the Academy his entire painting collection, including works by Titian, Velasquez, Guardi, Rembrandt, Jan van Goyen, Jacob van Ruisdael, and many others. Today his collection forms the main component of the Picture Gallery of the Academy of Fine Arts Vienna.

Lamberg-Sprinzenstein died in Vienna. He has never married and didn't have children.

References

1740 births
1822 deaths
Diplomats from Vienna
Austrian art collectors